Ian McKeever  (born 30 November 1946) is a contemporary British artist. Since 1990 McKeever has lived and worked in Hartgrove, Dorset, England.

Biography
McKeever was born and raised in Withernsea, East Riding of Yorkshire. He studied English Literature and began working as an artist in 1968. In 1970 he took his first studio at SPACE, St. Katherine's dock, London, an artists' initiative set up by Bridget Riley and Peter Sedgley. His first group exhibition was held in West Berlin in 1971, and this was soon followed by his first solo exhibition at Cardiff Arts Centre. He was awarded the Arts Council Bursary in 1973 and in the same year held his first London solo exhibition at the Institute of Contemporary Arts (ICA). In 1989 he was awarded the DAAD scholarship in Berlin. This was followed in 1990 by a major retrospective exhibition of his work at the Whitechapel Gallery, London. In 2003 he was elected a Royal Academician.

Works
McKeever's early landscape photographic/drawing works such as Field Series (19780 and Waterfalls (1979) were influenced by the writings of Robert Smithson, followed by the over-painted landscape photographs in such groups as Lapland Paintings (1985–1986) and History of Rocks (1986–1988) where the painterly gesture comes to the fore. And finally, beginning with the Door Paintings (1990–1994), McKeever's works became more concerned with pure painting hovering between abstraction and a residual sense of figuration. This phase continues to this day in such groups of paintings as Temple Paintings (2004–2006) and Twelve-Standing (2009–2012) with an increased paring down of discernible subject matter in the work and an emphasis on the quality of light.

"Light in a painting intrigues me enormously: how to imbue a painting with light so that one is not actually depicting it, but somehow its quality is implicitly within the painting— [...] emanating from it."

In 2006 McKeever returned to working with photographs, however they are now kept independent of his painted works.

Gallery

Writings
McKeever has written numerous texts and essays on art, including personal reflections on painting and on other painters' works. His 1982 manifesto titled Black and White...Or how to paint with a hammer (published by Matt's Gallery, London), expounded his internal conflict between the subjective nature of painting and the more conceptual parameters his work had adhered to so far. In 2005, his lectures at Cambridge University and the University of Brighton were published as three essays in the book In Praise of Painting, covering topics such as the presence and absence of light in Western painting. Writings on other artists include Thoughts on Emil Nolde in 1996; Absolute Light, an essay on Russian icons for the British Museum magazine in 2004; and Thinking about Georgia O'Keeffe for the Louisiana Revy, Louisiana Museum of Modern Art, Humlebæk, Denmark.

Exhibitions
Selected Exhibitions

2012 Josef Albers Museum, Bottrop; National Museum of Norway, Oslo
2011 Sønderjylands Kunstmuseum, Tønder; Tate Britain, London
2010 Royal Academy of Arts, London
2009 Kings Place Gallery, London
2008 Alan Cristea Gallery, London
2007 Morat-Institut für Kunst und Kunstwissenschaft, Freiburg i.Br.; Tate St Ives, Cornwall
2006 New Carlsberg Glyptotek, Copenhagen
2005 National Art Gallery, Beijing; Shanghai Art Museum, Shanghai
2004 Kettle's Yard, Cambridge
2003 Nordiska Akvarellmuseet, Skärhamn
2002 Horsens Kunstmuseum
2001 Kunsthallen Brandts, Odense
1999 Yale Center for British Art, Newhaven, Connecticut
1995 Matt's Gallery, London; Scottish National Gallery of Modern Art, Edinburgh; Yale Center for British Art, New Haven, Connecticut; Tate Gallery, London
1993 Stephen Solovy Gallery, Chicago
1992 Museum Folkwang, Essen
1991 Musée Cantonal des Beaux-Arts, Lausanne
1990 DAAD Galerie, West Berlin; Whitechapel Art Gallery, London
1989 Kunstforum, Städtische Galerie im Lenbachhaus, Munich; Tate Gallery, Liverpool
1988 Guinness Hop Store, Dublin
1987 Arnolfini, Bristol; Kunstverein Braunschweig; Museum of Modern Art, Oxford; Royal Museums of Art and History, Brussels, 
1986 Frankfurter Kunstverein / Schirn Kunsthalle, Frankfurt
1985 Galerie Nächst St Stephan, Vienna; Walker Art Gallery, Liverpool; Moderna Museet, Stockholm
1983 Bonner Kunstverein, Bonn
1982 Kunsthalle Nürnberg
1981 Walker Art Gallery, Liverpool; Museum of Modern Art, Oxford; Institute of Contemporary Arts, London
1979 Nigel Greenwood Gallery, London
1978 Richard Demarco Gallery, Edinburgh; Galleria Foksal, Warsaw
1976 Ikon Gallery, Birmingham; Badischer Kunstverein, Karlsruhe

Collections
Selected Collections:

Arts Council of Great Britain, London
British Council, London
British Museum, London
Government Art Collection of Great Britain, London
The Royal Academy of Art, London
Tate Gallery, London
Birmingham Museum and Art Gallery, Birmingham
Scottish National Gallery of Modern Art, Edinburgh
Museum des 20. Jahrhunderts, Vienna, Austria
Horsens Kunstmuseum, Horsens, Denmark
Louisiana Museum of Modern Art, Humlebæk, Denmark
New Carlsberg Foundation and New Carlsberg Glyptotek, Copenhagen, Denmark 
Sønderjyllands Kunstmuseum, Tønder, Denmark
Museum of Contemporary Art, Helsinki, Finland
Porin Taidemuseo, Pori, Finland
Morat-Institut für Kunst und Kunstwissenschaft, Freiburg, Germany
Kunsthalle Kiel, Germany
Kunsthalle Nürnberg, Nuremberg, Germany
Museum of Fine Art, Budapest, Hungary
Nordic Aquarell Museum, Skärham, Sweden
National Gallery of South Africa, Johannesburg
Boston Museum of Fine Art, Boston, USA
Brooklyn Museum of Art, New York City
Cincinnati Museum of Modern Art, Cincinnati, USA
The Haggerty Museum of Modern Art, Milwaukee, USA
Metropolitan Museum of Art, New York City
MIT List Visual Arts Center, Massachusetts, USA
Yale Center for British Art, Connecticut, USA

Notes

References
Ian McKeever: Paintings. With essays by Marjorie Allthorpe-Guyton, Michael Tucker, Catherine Lampert. Surrey: Lund Humphries, 2009. 
McKeever: Hartgrove, Paintings and Photographs. With contributions from Heinz Liesbrock, Richard Deacon and Ian McKeever. Cologne: Verlag der Buchhandlung Walther König, 2012.

External links

 Artist website
 
 The Royal Academy of Arts
 Tate online
 Profile on Royal Academy of Arts Collections

Royal Academicians
British abstract artists
British landscape painters
Artist authors
20th-century English painters
English male painters
English contemporary artists
21st-century English painters
Photographers from Yorkshire
Living people
1946 births
People from Withernsea
Academics of Camberwell College of Arts
20th-century English male artists
21st-century English male artists